A monocle is a corrective lens used to correct the vision in only one eye. 

Monocle may also refer to:

Monocle (satirical magazine), American satirical magazine, published irregularly from the late 1950s until the mid-1960s
Monocle (brand) a news/lifestyle magazine, published since 2007, and media brand
Monocle (comics), fictional DC Comics supervillain
Monocle (Transformers), a character from Transformers: Cybertron

See also
Monocular
The Monocle (disambiguation)